Aftermath Entertainment is an American record label founded by hip hop producer and rapper Dr. Dre. It operates as a subsidiary of, and is distributed through, Interscope Records.

Current acts include Dr. Dre, Eminem, Kendrick Lamar, Anderson .Paak and Silk Sonic, with former acts including 50 Cent, The Game, Busta Rhymes and many others.

History 
Upon his departure from Death Row Records on March 22, 1996, Dr. Dre quickly launched Aftermath Entertainment through Interscope Records. It was founded as a "boutique label" that prides itself on "quality over quantity", focusing on small numbers of high-profile releases.

Dr. Dre Presents: The Aftermath was released towards the year's end featuring artists who were amongst the label's first signees. In the autumn of 1997, Aftermath released the only collaborative project by hip hop supergroup The Firm (composed of Nas, Foxy Brown, AZ and Nature). Despite the highly anticipated album featuring production and cameo appearances by Dr. Dre himself, debuting atop the Billboard 200 and being certified platinum, it sold below commercial expectation. The group subsequently disbanded.

Upon recommendation from Interscope head Jimmy Iovine, Dr. Dre signed Eminem to Interscope and Aftermath on March 9, 1998. The following year (1999), Eminem's major-label debut album, The Slim Shady LP was released. The album debuted at number two on the Billboard 200 and number one on the Top R&B/Hip-Hop Albums chart, went on to be certified quadruple platinum, and arguably became the label's first successful album release. Also in 1999, Aftermath released 2001, Dr. Dre's follow-up to his 1992 album, The Chronic. The album went on to be certified six-times-platinum.

Several more artists were signed to, and later dropped from Aftermath, including Hittman and Rakim due to production conflicts. Legal troubles forced singer Truth Hurts to subsequently get dropped from the label after her album's release.

In 2002, New York City rapper 50 Cent signed to Aftermath by Dr. Dre after signing to Interscope through Eminem's Shady Records. 50 Cent's major-label debut album Get Rich or Die Tryin' was released on February 6, 2003 through Interscope, Shady, and Aftermath. Get Rich Or Die Tryin'   featured production from Dr. Dre, who also executive produced the album. Highly anticipated and anchored by the success of the singles 21 Questions and If I Can't, the album debuted at number one the Billboard Top 200. Selling 872,000 copies in its first week, the album went on to be certified 9× Platinum in America in 2020.

The Game, who signed with the label in 2003, also released his debut album The Documentary through a joint venture with G-Unit Records in 2005. Shortly after the release of The Documentary, tension between The Game and 50 Cent ignited, resulting in The Game leaving Aftermath in 2006.

Busta Rhymes was also signed and released one album before later being dropped from the label due to conflict with Interscope head, Iovine. His album, then titled Blessed, since retitled Back on My B.S., was to be released on Aftermath. It was later reported that when he signed a deal with Universal Motown, the album would be released on his label, Flipmode Entertainment, through his Universal Motown deal. Stat Quo was also released from the label in 2008, citing differences in direction.

In January 2010, it was revealed that Bishop Lamont had left the label due to the repeated delay of his debut, The Reformation, while long time Aftermath R&B singer, Marsha Ambrosius, had also left the label.

On March 8, 2012, it was announced that Kendrick Lamar had officially signed with the label.

On October 15, 2013, Jon Connor announced his signing to Aftermath during the 2013 BET Hip Hop Awards.

On February 20, 2014, 50 Cent announced his departure from his Interscope record deal which included his deal with Aftermath and Shady.

On August 7, 2015, Dr. Dre released his latest album, Compton.

In August 2022, the Dr. Dre produced the remix of Kanye West’s song Use This Gospel, a collaboration between DJ Khaled, Eminem and West, went on to feature on Khaled's thirtheeth studio album, God Did. The song was co-produced by Dre’s team, The ICU, whom he named so after his brain aneurysm diagnosis. The team is composed of Dawaun Parker, Dem Jointz, Erik "Blu2th" Griggs, Focus..., Fredwreck and Mark Batson among others. The remix  reached the top position on both the US Christian Songs and Gospel Songs charts, earning Khaled and Eminem their first #1 on the charts and West his fifth.

Artists

Current acts

Former acts

Current producers 
 Dawaun Parker
 Dem Jointz
 DJ Khalil
 Focus...
 Fredwreck
 Mark Batson

Former producers 
 Bud'da
 Che Pope
 Chris "The Glove" Taylor
 Hi-Tek
 Melvin "Mel-Man" Bradford
 Mike Elizondo
 Scott Storch
 Taz Arnold

Discography

Studio albums

Compilation albums

References 

American record labels
Dr. Dre
Hip hop discographies
Interscope Records
American hip hop record labels
Labels distributed by Universal Music Group
Record labels established in 1996
Contemporary R&B record labels
Gangsta rap record labels
1996 establishments in the United States